The France national beach soccer team represents France in international beach soccer competitions and is controlled by the FFF, the governing body for football in France.

Competitive record

FIFA Beach Soccer World Cup Qualification (UEFA)

Current squad
Correct as of July 2012:

Coach: Stéphane François

Notable players
 Eric Cantona
 Andy Delort
 Samir Belamri
 Jairzinho Cardoso
 Thierry Ottavy
 Jean Saidou
 Gregory Tanagro
 Mickaël Pagis
 Sébastien Sansoni
 Kalandje O.Mponda

Achievements
 2011 Euro Beach Soccer League Promotional winners
 FIFA Beach Soccer World Cup: 1 (2005)
 Euro Beach Soccer League: 1 (2004)

References

External links
BSWW Profile
Profile on Beach Soccer Russia

European national beach soccer teams
B